Gottfried Kreuzer was an Austrian luger who competed in the mid-1970s. A natural track luger, he won the bronze medal in the men's doubles event at the 1975 FIL European Luge Natural Track Championships in Feld am See, Austria.

References
Natural track European Championships results 1970-2006.

Austrian male lugers
Possibly living people
Year of birth missing